The ATP Osaka (aka Salem Open) was a men's tennis tournament played in Osaka, Japan.  The event was played as part of the ATP Tour in 1993 and 1994.  It was played on outdoor hard courts at the Esaka Tennis Center.

Finals

Singles

Doubles

References

Hard court tennis tournaments
Defunct tennis tournaments in Japan
ATP Tour